Alfred B. Jupiter (June 1871 – February 28, 1911) was an American Negro league pitcher in the 1890s.

A native of Phelps, New York, Jupiter played for the Cuban Giants in 1897. He died in Boston, Massachusetts in 1911 at age 39.

References

External links
Baseball statistics and player information from Baseball-Reference Black Baseball Stats and Seamheads

1871 births
1911 deaths
Date of birth missing
Cuban Giants players
20th-century African-American people